Climate change in the Gambia is having impacts on the natural environment and people of The Gambia. Like other countries in West Africa, the impacts of climate change are expected to be varied and complex. Climate change adaptation is going to be important to achieve the Sustainable Development Goals in the country.

Impacts on the natural environment 
The Sahel climate makes the ecoregion particularly vulnerable to changes in water. Climate change is expected to increase or make more severe windstorms, floods, droughts, and coastal erosion and saltwater intrusion.

Temperature and weather changes

Impacts on people

Economic impacts 

Agriculture is 26% of the GDP and employs 68% of the labor force. Much of the agriculture is rain fed, so changes in precipitation will have significant impacts. In 2012, drought plus increased food prices led to a food crisis in the region. Rice farmers near the coast are also experiencing saltwater intrusion.

Fisheries are also vulnerable, with changes to breeding grounds for coastal fishery species putting additional pressure on already unsustainable fishery practices.

Infrastructure is already seeing major losses from flooding and windstorms. For example, urban floods in 2020 severely damaged at least 2371 houses, and destroyed crops.

Mitigation and adaptation

Policies and legislation 
The Gambia has published a Climate Change Priority Action Plan  that focuses on 24 cross-sectoral activities.

International cooperation 
United Nations Environment Programme started a $20.5 million project in partnership with the Government of Gambia to restore  forests and marginal agricultural land.

References 

Gambia
Environment of the Gambia
Gambia